The M8 is a short metropolitan route in Cape Town, South Africa. It connects Milnerton with Edgemead.

Route 
The M8 begins at a junction with the M5 (Koeberg Road) in Milnerton. It heads eastwards, crossing the N7 Highway, to enter Edgemead, where it meets the M12 (Giel Basson Drive) and ends immediately thereafter at a junction with the M14 (Plattekloof Road).

References 

Roads in Cape Town
Streets and roads of Cape Town
Metropolitan routes in Cape Town